Hemal Jayantilal Mehta (born 6 March 1974 in Calicut) is a left-handed Indian-born cricketer who played for the Oman national cricket team and bowled a slow left-arm orthodox. He served as the captain of the Oman squad and has captained the team during the ICC Cricket World Cup Qualifier 2009 and the ACC Challenge Trophy 2009.

References

1974 births
Living people
Omani cricketers
Cricketers from Kozhikode
Indian emigrants to Oman
Indian expatriates in Oman
Omani cricket captains